The British decimal fifty pence coin (often shortened to 50p in writing and speech) is a denomination of sterling coinage worth  of one pound. Its obverse features the profile of the current Monarch since the coin's introduction in 1969. , five different royal portraits have been used.

 there were an estimated 920 million 50p coins in circulation. The coin has proved popular with coin collectors leading to numerous differing designs for both commemorative and circulating coins.

Fifty pence coins are legal tender for amounts up to the sum of £10 when offered in repayment of a debt; however, the coin's legal tender status is not normally relevant for everyday transactions.

History
In 1967 the Deputy Master of the Royal Mint approached the Decimal Currency Board to ask for their advice on the introduction of a new coin. The 10-shilling note then in use was lasting only five months and it had been suggested that a coin, which could last fifty years, would be more economical. The problem with this was that all coins are arranged in "tiers", each coin in a tier having the same weight-to-value ratio so that a bag of mixed coins could be weighed to ascertain the value so long as they were all bronze, all silver, etc. Each coin was identified within its tier by its size and each tier had to be capable of being identified by sight and touch. This was achieved in the then-existing sets by the use of different materials ("bronze", "brass" and "silver") with the bronze coins having plain rims, the nickel-brass threepenny bit being 12-sided and the silver coins having milled rims. If the 10-shilling coin was to be made in the same tier as the silver coins it would have to be twice the weight of the Crown (then and now only in use for commemorative coins) and it was generally agreed that that would make it very unpopular and expensive. It would therefore have to be in a new tier of its own.

The Mint could not find a suitable metal which was sufficiently different in colour to the existing coins and which would not tarnish. This last point was thought to be important because the new coin would be the most valuable coin in general circulation in the world. It therefore had to be a different shape; various methods had been used overseas to overcome this problem but none were without drawbacks. A hole through the coin did unacceptable things to the Queen's head (a legal requirement on British coins), and wavy-edged, flat-edged or square coins could not be used in the coin-handling machinery which was then coming into increasing use in industry, banking and vending. To be used in a vending or sorting machine a coin would have to roll under gravity and be capable of being measured without being presented in a special way; in other words it needed a constant breadth at whichever angle it was measured.

The Technical Member (and the only engineer) on the Decimal Currency Board was Hugh Conway, at that time President of the Institution of Mechanical Engineers and Managing Director of Bristol Siddeley Engines, Bristol. He had found in a mathematical textbook a formula for a non-circular shape of constant breadth and asked the design office at Patchway, near Bristol, which normally worked on the engines for aircraft such as Concorde, Vulcan and Harrier to draw out the shape. However, this turned out to be a wavy-edged form with re-entrant sides which would not roll and which could not be measured easily. A designer, Colin Lewis, suggested a much simpler shape which in its basic form is an equilateral triangle with a small circle centred on each apex and with a larger circular arc centred on each apex but tangential to each of the two opposite small circles. Wherever it was measured, the breadth of this shape was one small radius plus one large radius. (The small radius was not strictly necessary to the geometry, but made the shape more practical by removing inconvenient sharp points and reducing the rate of wear, and therefore change of size, in handling.) The number of corners could be any odd number greater than one. A drawing was made to illustrate the proposal which was accepted by Hugh Conway. He chose seven sides as a compromise between too radical a shape, which might not be acceptable to the public, and having too many sides, which would make a shape visually difficult to differentiate from a circle. The shape was drawn out by David Brown and samples made from stainless steel by the Model Shop, together with a section of perspex channel with a bend to demonstrate that the "coin" would roll around corners and drop through gauging slots. The legend "50" was photo-etched (from a master drawn by Ray Gooding) on the faces of the samples since it had already been decided that the new coin would be the first coin of the new Decimal series. As the coin was released before Decimal Day is was initially worth 10/- (and therefore 120d).

When the Decimal Currency Board met none of the other members had any suggestion to make, so when the samples were produced the idea was accepted without opposition.

Design
It was the first seven-sided coin in the world. However, there was some confusion and resistance to the new shape after its release on 14 October 1969, where the coins were mistaken for the decimal 10p and Half crowns, which were both round. A group of "Anti-Heptagonists" regarded the coin as 'ugly' and 'an insult to our sovereign whose image it bears'. Geometrically, the shape of the coin forms an equilateral-curve heptagon, or Reuleaux polygon, a curve of constant width, meaning that the diameter is constant across any bisection.

In 1997 the 50p coin was reduced in both diameter and thickness and the older coins were removed from circulation. The new coin was introduced on 1 September 1997. The old larger coin was demonetised on 28 February 1998. The face designs remained unchanged.

The shape of the original 50p coin was also used for the 20p coin, introduced in 1982, but in a smaller size.

Obverse (Heads)
For Queen Elizabeth II, four different obverses have been used.

As with all new decimal currency, until 1984 the portrait of Queen Elizabeth II by Arnold Machin appeared on the obverse, in which the Queen wears the 'Girls of Great Britain and Ireland' Tiara.

Between 1985 and 1997 the portrait by Raphael Maklouf was used, in which the Queen wears the George IV State Diadem.

In 2008 the obverse design was rotated, to match the new reverse design which is displayed with the heptagon point down rather than point up.

From 2015 to 2022, coins bearing the portrait by Jody Clark were issued, which again featured the Diadem.

On 3 October 2022, a commemorative 50p coin was released that was the first to carry the portrait of King Charles III following the death of Elizabeth II. The coin, planned both as part of a commemorative set and for general circulation, featured a copy of the design used on the crown (five-shilling piece) released in 1953 to commemorate the Queen's coronation. The portrait of the King was undertaken by Martin Jennings.

Reverse (Tails)
The reverse of the coin, designed by Christopher Ironside, and used from 1969 to 2008, is a seated Britannia alongside a lion, holding an olive branch in her left hand and a trident in her right, accompanied by either NEW PENCE (1969–1981) or FIFTY PENCE (1982–2008) above Britannia, with the numeral 50 underneath the seated figure. His original but unused design, of the Royal Arms with supporters was released as a variation in 2013.

In August 2005 the Royal Mint launched a competition to find new reverse designs for all circulating coins apart from the £2 coin. The winner, announced in April 2008, was Matthew Dent, whose designs were gradually introduced into the circulating British coinage from mid-2008. The designs for the 1p, 2p, 5p, 10p, 20p and 50p coins depict sections of the Royal Shield that form the whole shield when placed together. The shield in its entirety was featured on the now-obsolete round £1 coin. The 50p coin depicts the lowest point of the Shield, with the words FIFTY PENCE below the point of the shield. The coin's obverse remains unchanged.

Variations
In addition to the standard designs there have been several variant reverse designs used on the 50p coin to commemorate important events. These are summarised in the table below.

†Refers to the year minted on the coin itself

The following coins were produced by the Royal Mint as commemorative releases only, without being intended for release into circulation:

There are also other variants not listed here which were minted by other Mints, such as Pobjoy Mint

Status as legal tender 

Fifty pence coins are legal tender for amounts up to and including £10. However, "legal tender" has a very specific and narrow meaning, and payees may accept or refuse payment in any form they choose.

Mintages
Mintage figures below represent the number of coins of each date released for circulation. Mint Sets have been produced since 1982; where mintages on or after that date indicate 'none' or 'Proof only', there are examples contained within those sets.

References

External links

 Royal Mint – 50p coin Design and Specifications
 Fifty Pence, Coin Type from United Kingdom – Online Coin Club

Fifty Pence
Currencies introduced in 1969
Fifty-cent coins